The Star European Championships are international sailing regattas in the Star class. The championships are open to sailors of all nationalities.

Most titles have Agostino Straulino and Nicolò Rode, with ten titles each, of whom nine were together.

Editions

Medalists

References

See also
 Star World Championships

External links

 
European championships in sailing
Star (keelboat) competitions
Recurring sporting events established in 1932